Hydra Cove is a small cove indenting for 200 m the northwest coast of Varna Peninsula, Livingston Island in the South Shetland Islands, Antarctica and entered north of Gargoyle Bastion.

The feature is named after the Lernaean Hydra, a monster with nine heads slain by Hercules.

Location

Maps
 L.L. Ivanov et al. Antarctica: Livingston Island and Greenwich Island, South Shetland Islands. Scale 1:100000 topographic map. Sofia: Antarctic Place-names Commission of Bulgaria, 2005.
 L.L. Ivanov. Antarctica: Livingston Island and Greenwich, Robert, Snow and Smith Islands. Scale 1:120000 topographic map.  Troyan: Manfred Wörner Foundation, 2009.

References
Composite Antarctic Gazetteer.

Coves of Livingston Island